Mieke  Havik (born 18 January 1957) is a road cyclist from the Netherlands. She participated at the 1987 UCI Road World Championships in the Women's team time trial.

References

External links
 profile at dewielersite.net

1957 births
Dutch female cyclists
UCI Road World Championships cyclists for the Netherlands
Living people
Sportspeople from Heeze-Leende
Cyclists from North Brabant
20th-century Dutch women